Communay is a commune in the Rhône department in eastern France. It is around 15 km south of the centre of Lyon.

See also
Communes of the Rhône department

References

External links

 Official website

Communes of Rhône (department)